David Todd Christofferson (born January 24, 1945) is an American religious leader and former lawyer who serves as a member of the Quorum of the Twelve Apostles of the Church of Jesus Christ of Latter-day Saints (LDS Church). He has been a general authority of the church since 1993. Currently, he is the ninth most senior apostle in the church.

Christofferson grew up in Utah and New Jersey, and after high school served as an LDS missionary in Argentina. He then studied English literature at Brigham Young University (BYU) before attending law school at Duke University. After graduating from law school in 1972, Christofferson clerked for Judge John Sirica on the U.S. District Court for the District of Columbia while Sirica presided over much of the legal proceedings stemming from the Watergate scandal. Christofferson then entered private practice, and eventually became an in-house lawyer for NationsBank (now part of Bank of America).

Early life
Christofferson was born in American Fork, Utah, and raised in Pleasant Grove, Utah; Lindon, Utah; and Somerset, New Jersey. As a young man, he served a two-year LDS mission in Argentina. His mission president was Richard G. Scott, who would already be a member of the Quorum of the Twelve when Christofferson was called to the same quorum. After his mission, he earned a bachelor's degree from BYU in English and international relations in 1969, followed by a J.D. from Duke University School of Law in 1972.

Christofferson began his legal career as a law clerk to Judge John J. Sirica of the U.S. District Court for the District of Columbia from 1972 to 1974. Shortly after Christofferson began clerking, Sirica was assigned to preside over the Watergate legal proceedings.

After his work as a judicial clerk, Christofferson was an active member of the US military and then served in the reserves for eight years.

Career and family
As a lawyer, Christofferson worked in Washington, D.C.; Nashville, Tennessee; Herndon, Virginia; and Charlotte, North Carolina. Christofferson was the associate general counsel for NationsBank in Charlotte and was the volunteer chairman of Affordable Housing of Nashville, Tennessee.

Christofferson clerked for Judge John J. Sirica during the Watergate trials. Together they were the first outside the White House to hear the Nixon White House tapes. "Judge Sirica and I were shocked as we heard Nixon calmly ask" how much money it would take to keep the Watergate burglars quiet, Christofferson said in a June 2017 address to faculty and students at Christ Church College in Oxford, England. "The judge and I couldn't believe, didn't want to believe what we were hearing … He passed me a note suggesting we rewind the tape and listen again. Up to this point we both still hoped that the president [of the United States] was not really involved, but this was indisputable."

Christofferson married Katherine Jacob in the Salt Lake Temple on May 28, 1968. They are the parents of five children.

LDS Church service
Prior to becoming a general authority, Christofferson served in the LDS Church as a bishop, stake president, and regional representative. At the church's April 1993 general conference, Christofferson was called as a general authority and member of the First Quorum of the Seventy. In August 1998, Christofferson became a member of the Presidency of the Seventy.

As a seventy, Christofferson served as the executive director of the church's Family and Church History Department. While in this position he was involved in negotiations with Jewish leaders on policies on temple work for Holocaust victims, which concluded with the church stating that its members should only do such temple work for family members. He also was in charge of the department when the church completed the Freedman's Savings Bank Records project.

On April 5, 2008, during the solemn assembly session of the church's general conference when Thomas S. Monson was sustained as church president, Christofferson was sustained as a member of the Quorum of the Twelve Apostles. As a member of the Quorum of the Twelve, Christofferson is regarded by church members as a prophet, seer, and revelator.

Works
Articles

Honors
World Peace Prize (2017)

Notes

References

—Reuters interview with Christofferson

External links
General Authorities and General Officers: Elder D. Todd Christofferson

1945 births
20th-century Mormon missionaries
American general authorities (LDS Church)
American lawyers
American Mormon missionaries in Argentina
Apostles (LDS Church)
Brigham Young University alumni
Duke University School of Law alumni
Living people
People from American Fork, Utah
Presidents of the Seventy (LDS Church)
Regional representatives of the Twelve
Latter Day Saints from Utah
Latter Day Saints from New Jersey
Latter Day Saints from Washington, D.C.
Latter Day Saints from Virginia
Latter Day Saints from North Carolina
Latter Day Saints from Tennessee
People from Pleasant Grove, Utah
People from Lindon, Utah